Íþróttafélag Grindavíkur, commonly known as ÍG, is a basketball club in Grindavík, Iceland.

Trophies and achievements

Trophies
2. deild karla: 
Winners: (2) 2011, 2014
Runner-ups: (4) 2001, 2003, 2006, 2009

Notable past players
 Guðmundur Bragason
 Helgi Jónas Guðfinnsson

References

Basketball teams in Iceland